Valyra ( pronounced Valira) is a small village in southern Greece. Situated on the Peloponnese Peninsula, Valyra was the seat of the Ithomi municipality. Located near the ancient city of Messene, it lies 18 km NW of Kalamata, and about 177 km SW of Athens.

References  

Populated places in Messenia